Major General Frederich ('Fritz') Wilhelm Loots  (1917 – 2008) was a general in the South African Defence Force (SADF). He was founder of the South African Special Forces and their first commanding officer.

Early life and education 
Born in Britstown on 26 April 1917, Loots was educated at Theron High School. After high school in 1936, he joined the Special Service Battalion, a unit formed to train young men in military and work skills during the depression.

Career 
In 1939, he joined the Union Defence Force in the Infantry Corps and served in World War II. By 1947 he held the rank of Warrant Officer and in 1951 he was commissioned as an officer. He held various positions as a Staff Officer in the SADF before becoming Officer Commanding the Army Gymnasium from 1959 to 1963.

In 1963, he was appointed to command South West Africa Command until 1964. By 1965 he was a Senior Staff Officer at Military Intelligence and then the Director of Military Intelligence from 1966 until 1970. His last position was as Inspector General of the SADF which ended in June 1973 when he retired. 

He returned from retirement in August 1974 to found the South African Special Forces. In 1980 Loots led Operation Winter, which was undertaken to recruit former members of the Rhodesian Security Forces to serve with South Africa. He continued in the SADF until his retirement on 25 April 1982. Major General Loots died on 12 August 2008.

Awards and decorations

References

1917 births
Afrikaner people
South African people of Dutch descent
South African Army generals
South African military officers
South African military personnel of the Border War
2008 deaths
South African military personnel of World War II